The Memorial Cup is a junior ice hockey club championship trophy awarded annually to the Canadian Hockey League (CHL) champion. Each year the champions from three CHL member leagues—the Western Hockey League (WHL), Ontario Hockey League (OHL), and Quebec Major Junior Hockey League (QMJHL), along with a host team—compete in the MasterCard Memorial Cup Tournament. The QMJHL's Saint John Sea Dogs are the defending champions.

Known originally as the OHA Memorial Cup, it was donated in 1919 by the Ontario Hockey Association in honour of the soldiers who died fighting for Canada in World War I.  In 2010, the trophy was rededicated to honour all soldiers who died for Canada in any conflict. From its donation in 1919 until 1971, the Memorial Cup was awarded via a series of playoffs to the junior hockey champion of Canada. The Canadian Amateur Hockey Association moved to the current tournament format in 1972 when it divided Junior A hockey into two tiers, naming the Memorial Cup as the championship of the Major Junior rank. Sixty teams across the CHL's three member leagues are eligible to compete for the Memorial Cup, representing nine provinces and four American states.

The Western Hockey League has won the title 19 times since the adoption of the three league tournament format in 1972.  The Ontario Hockey League has 17 titles, and the Quebec Major Junior Hockey League has 13.

Since the creation of the Memorial Cup, the Toronto Marlboros have won the most titles with seven. Among currently active teams, the Oshawa Generals lead with five titles, the latest one in 2015, while the Regina Pats follow with four.

Champions and challengers

1919 to 1971

The Memorial Cup was presented to the Canadian Amateur Hockey Association (CAHA) in 1919  by the Ontario Hockey Association (OHA) in remembrance of the soldiers who died fighting for Canada in World War I. It was to be awarded to the junior hockey champions of Canada in an east versus west format. Over its first 53 years of competition, the Eastern Canada champion, who from 1932 won the George Richardson Memorial Trophy, met the Western Canada champion, winners of the Abbott Cup.  The first championship featured the University of Toronto Schools against the Regina Patricia (now the Pats) in a two-game, total-goals series.  The University of Toronto Schools won the title easily, defeating Regina by scores of 14–3 and 15–5 to win the series with a total score of 29–8. Through this initial 53 years, the eastern representative won 33 Memorial Cups, while the western representative won 20 Memorial Cups. Note that teams from Port Arthur, Ontario, while technically located in Eastern Canada, had easier access to leagues in Manitoba for competition during the regular season, and thus represented Western Canada on the three occasions they competed for the Memorial Cup.

The head-to-head competition for the Memorial Cup has changed formats several times.  The CAHA moved to a best-of-three format in 1925 as the first team to win two games was declared the champion.  In 1938, the series was increased to best-of-five, and to best-of-seven in 1943.  There were two exceptions to these formats. The 1949 final between the Montreal Royals and the Brandon Wheat Kings required an eighth game after the third game ended in a tie.

The first 36 Memorial Cups were generally held in either Toronto or Winnipeg, as the CAHA acknowledged budget constraints and travel costs in the world's second largest country. Starting in 1955, with better transportation infrastructure, the Cup was generally contested in the hometown of one of the finalists.

The 1971 final between the Quebec Remparts and the Edmonton Oil Kings was nearly canceled outright in the wake of controversy surrounding the inclusion of the previously outlawed Western Canada Hockey League (WCHL) as the western league was allowed to use more over-age players and received a larger travel allowance from the CAHA.  The differences were resolved, and an abbreviated best-of-three series was held in Quebec City.

While the Memorial Cup was not intended to be a challenge trophy, a team has twice challenged the defending champion for the cup.  After the Toronto Canoe Club defeated the Selkirk Fishermen in 1920, they were met with a challenge by the Fort William Beavers for the trophy.  Toronto agreed, and easily defeated Fort William 11–1 in a single game playoff.  The second challenge occurred a half-century later, in 1970.  The WCHL's Flin Flon Bombers challenged the Montreal Junior Canadiens.  Considered an outlaw league by the CAHA, WCHL teams were not permitted to participate in the Memorial Cup playoffs.  The Junior Canadiens declined the challenge.

TG = total goals, with the team scoring the most goals in two games winning the championship. From 1925 onward, the total represents the number of games won.

1972 to 1982
In 1970, the CAHA divided the Junior A ranks into two levels, creating a Major–Junior tier that consisted of three leagues: the Quebec Major Junior Hockey League (QMJHL), the Ontario Hockey Association (OHA, now the OHL) and the Western Canada Hockey League (WCHL, now WHL).  It was decided that the Memorial Cup would be the championship trophy of the Major Junior leagues, while the Manitoba Centennial Trophy was created as the Junior A championship.  The CAHA decided that beginning in 1972, the Memorial Cup would be determined via a double round-robin tournament (four games each) between the champion of the three leagues, featuring a single game championship involving the top two finishers in the tournament.  The creation of the WHL's Portland Winter Hawks in 1976 opened the competition up to non-Canadian teams for the first time, and in 1982, the Winter Hawks became the first American team in Memorial Cup history to compete for the trophy.

1983 to present

The Memorial Cup tournament was expanded to four teams in 1983; a pre-determined host team was added in place of holding the tournament in a neutral host city.  The first such host team was the Portland Winter Hawks, who set numerous firsts in the 1983 tournament.  It represented the first time Memorial Cup games were held outside Canada, and by virtue of winning the tournament, the Winter Hawks became the first American team to win the Cup.  The Winter Hawks also became the first team in Memorial Cup history to win the championship despite failing to win its own league title—they had been defeated by the Lethbridge Broncos in the WHL playoffs.

The four-team format remains in use, and the host team cycles evenly between all three leagues.  In 1987, however, only three teams competed for the Memorial Cup.  To determine the host team for that tournament, the OHL held a "super series" between its two regular season division winners before the start of the playoffs.  The tournament was won by the Oshawa Generals, who went on to win the OHL championship.  As a result, the OHL chose to send only Oshawa to the Memorial Cup.  In all other tournaments, if the host team had also won their league title, the runner-up from the championship series qualified for the Memorial Cup as their league's representative.

Since the current format was adopted, the Memorial Cup has been won by each league (as of 2022):
 Western Hockey League (WHL):  16 times
 Ontario Hockey League (OHL):  12 times
 Quebec Major Junior Hockey League (QMJHL):  10 times

Impact of automatic tournament berth for host team (since 1983):
 Host teams that have won league championship: 6 (Kamloops 1995, Peterborough 1996, Hull 1997, London 2005, Moncton 2006, Kitchener 2008)
 Host teams that have won Memorial Cup: 11 (Portland 1983, Sault Ste. Marie 1993, Kamloops 1995, Hull 1997, Ottawa 1999, Kelowna 2004, London 2005, Vancouver 2007, Shawinigan 2012, Windsor 2017, Saint John 2022)
 Host teams that have won Memorial Cup without winning league championship: 8 (Portland 1983, Sault Ste. Marie 1993, Ottawa 1999, Kelowna 2004, Vancouver 2007, Shawinigan 2012, Windsor 2017, Saint John 2022)
 Teams that have won the Memorial Cup without winning the league championship or being the host team: 1 (Quebec 2006)

The host team for each tournament is listed in bold.
If a team qualified for the tournament as the runner-up of their league's championship series, it is listed in italics.

Tournament appearances by current CHL teams
As of the completion of the 2022 Memorial Cup, the 60 teams currently active in the CHL  have won 45 of the 102 annual Memorial Cup competitions held since 1919.  The remaining 57 competitions were won by teams that no longer exist, or no longer compete in the CHL.

A bolded year denotes a Memorial Cup win.

An italicized year denotes team was host of the tournament.

Three team competition from 1972 to 1982 and 1987.  Since 1983, third place goes to loser of semi-final game.
^Portland Winterhawks excludes 10 appearances, with two wins, as the original Edmonton Oil Kings (1951-1976).
^^Kamloops Blazers excludes 1 appearance as the Estevan Bruins and 4 appearances, including two wins, as the original New Westminster Bruins.

Notes

 In 1987, the OHL organized a Super Series for the right to host the Memorial Cup tournament between the Leyden Division champions Oshawa Generals, and the Emms Division champions North Bay Centennials. The super series was played before the OHL playoffs commenced. Oshawa defeated North Bay 4 games to 3 for the right to host the Memorial Cup. Oshawa also won the OHL championship series defeating North Bay 4 games to 3. Since Oshawa won both the Super Series and the OHL Championship, only three teams participated in the Memorial Cup.

 The Chicoutimi Saguenéens hosted the 1988 tournament at the Centre Georges-Vézina of Chicoutimi, but were not guaranteed a berth. They were eliminated in the playoffs so the QMJHL sent the Drummondville Voltigeurs, who finished as the championship runners-up, in their place.

 The Dukes of Hamilton hosted the 1990 tournament at Copps Coliseum. However, because of the team's poor standing in the 1989–90 season, the team stepped aside for the OHL championship runners-up, the Kitchener Rangers.

 The Beauport Harfangs hosted the 1991 tournament, however were not guaranteed a berth. The Harfangs were eliminated in the playoffs. The QMJHL championship runners-up Drummondville Voltigeurs were awarded this berth. The Harfangs were based in Beauport, Quebec City, a suburb of Quebec City; however, the tournament was played in the Colisée Pepsi.

 The Sault Ste. Marie Greyhounds won the right to host the 1993 Memorial Cup by defeating the Peterborough Petes 4 games to 0 in a Super Series, much like how Oshawa hosted in 1987. However, the Petes won the OHL championship, thus granting them a spot in the tournament.

All three leagues suspended play on March 12, 2020, in response to the emerging coronavirus pandemic. On March 23, the CHL cancelled the remainder of the regular season, member league playoffs, and Memorial Cup which the Kelowna Rockets were set to host.

References
General

 
 
 
 

Specific

External links
 Canadian Hockey League

Memorial Cup champions
Memorial Cup
Memorial Cup champions